Greg Rusedski was the defending champion but lost in the quarterfinals to Martin Damm.

Byron Black won in the final 7–6(7–3), 6–3 against Damm.

Seeds
A champion seed is indicated in bold text while text in italics indicates the round in which that seed was eliminated.

  Byron Black (champion)
  Greg Rusedski (quarterfinals)
  Tim Henman (semifinals)
  Kenneth Carlsen (second round)
  Shuzo Matsuoka (quarterfinals)
  Johan van Herck (first round)
 n/a
  Jeff Tarango (second round)

Draw

Finals

Top half

Bottom half

References
 1996 KAL Cup Korea Open Draw

Seoul Open
1996 ATP Tour
1996 Seoul Open